Sheldon Jay Bachrach (born April 7, 1944, in Detroit, Michigan), or Shel Bachrach for short, is an American insurance broker, investor, businessman, and philanthropist.  He is regarded as one of the world's greatest entertainment insurance brokers.

Bachrach has held positions as President of Entertainment and High Net Worth divisions for USI (acquired by Goldman Sachs), and Albert G. Ruben of Beverly Hills. He was awarded the Guinness World Record in 1990 for the largest life and disability policy ever written at the time, valued at over $140 million.  He is currently founder and President of Bachrach & Associates, co-founder and Partner of Extract Value, and Director of American Chariot.

Professional history 

Bachrach wrote his first insurance policy for a major entertainer in 1983 and followed with policies for entertainers like Neil Simon, Van Halen, and Kiss. Early in his career, Bachrach was able to write insurance policies for previously uninsurable positions.

Shel Bachrach has pioneered practices that are employed by companies worldwide, including policies for:

 Advertising commercial wrap-ups for Fortune 500s such as Coca-Cola, McDonald's, Ford Motors, Philip Morris, and Toyota;
 Drug-related filming delays for stars such as Courtney Love in The People vs. Larry Flynt
 Actors who pilot aircraft, such as Harrison Ford in the blockbuster Air Force One
 Aging key persons, such as acclaimed director Sir David Lean, for his last movie ever made;
 Severe medical conditions, such as for Academy Award-winning director/actor John Huston;
 Pregnant actresses during filming for actresses like Bette Midler;
 Magicians, entertainers, and "Big Cats" performers, including popular Las Vegas acts; and
 Winnings for some of television's longest-running game shows like The Price Is Right.

Bachrach has appeared as an expert witness in Los Angeles County and Federal Court on Liability Insurance, including Errors & Omissions, Directors & Officers and Employment Practices Liability.

Philanthropy 

Shel Bachrach is on the Board of ABCs at Saint John's Health Center, major contributor to Cedars-Sinai, LACMA, and other well known Los Angeles institutions. The Bachrach Family is also on the Board of Governors at Cedars-Sinai, Members of the Amie Karen Cancer Fund for Children for over twenty years, Assistance League for over ten years, UNICEF, and a supporter of the Circle of Angels.

Personal life 

Shel Bachrach is married to Kathleen Wright Bachrach with four children and currently resides in his Bel Air estate with additional homes in Malibu, Palm Springs, and New York.  Bachrach's four children are Laura Bachrach, Scott Bachrach, Ryan Bachrach, and Courtney Bachrach. His grandchildren are Benjamin Bachrach and Asher Bachrach.

Film credits 

Shel Bachrach is also credited with providing insurance for television shows such as The Price Is Right, Miss Universe, Wanna Bet, Singing Bee, Lingo and First and Last.

References

External links 
 Official Website
 Shel Bachrach Profile on Yahoo! Movies

Living people
1944 births
American businesspeople in insurance
American philanthropists